Diuris filifolia, commonly known as the cat's face orchid, is a species of orchid which is endemic to the south-west of Western Australia. It is one of the rarest Diuris in Western Australia, sometimes flowering in large numbers but only after hot summer fires.

Description
Flowering occurs from October to November and is enhanced by a hot fire the previous summer.

Taxonomy and naming
Diuris filifolia was first formally described in 1840 by John Lindley and the description was published in A Sketch of the Vegetation of the Swan River Colony as an appendix to Edwards's Botanical Register. The specific epithet (filifolia) is derived from the Latin words filum meaning "thread" and folium meaning "a leaf", referring to the thin leaves at the base of the flowering stem of this species.

Distribution and habitat
The cat's face orchid grows in sandy soil on the edge of winter-wet areas between York and Mount Barker in the Swan Coastal Plain biogeographic region. It is a rare Diuris which sometimes flowers in large numbers but only after hot fires the previous summer.

Conservation
Diuris filifolia is classified as "not threatened" by the Western Australian Government Department of Parks and Wildlife.

References

filifolia
Endemic orchids of Australia
Orchids of Western Australia
Endemic flora of Western Australia
Plants described in 1840